Ivor Barry (12 April 1919 – 12 December 2006) was a Welsh film and television actor.

Born in South Wales, Barry served with the British Royal Artillery during World War II and completed his university studies prior to beginning his acting career. After bit parts in England, he moved to Canada in the early 1950s where he also wrote and adapted scripts for radio as well acting in television. He eventually moved to Hollywood in the 1960s, and made many television and film appearances over the next 25 years.

He played the part of Wyatt (Ilan Mitchell-Smith) and Chet (Bill Paxton) Donnelly's grandfather in the 1985 film Weird Science.

Barry's television appearances included Bonanza, Daniel Boone, Bewitched, Hawaii Five-O, Mission: Impossible, The Six Million Dollar Man, Fantasy Island, Punky Brewster, and Highway to Heaven.

He died of heart failure in Woodland Hills, Los Angeles, on 12 December 2006, aged 87.

Filmography
Under Capricorn (1949) - 1st Guard in Hall (uncredited)
Nobody Waved Good-bye (1964) - Interviewer
The King's Pirate (1967) - Cloudsly
 The Scorpio Letters (1967) - 	Rt. Hon. John Murney
In Enemy Country (1968) - Air Marshal Evelyn
The Lawyer (1970) - Wyler
The Andromeda Strain (1971) - Murray (uncredited)
Carola (TV - 1973) - Parmentier
Herbie Rides Again (1974) - Chauffeur
Lost in the Stars (1974) - Carmichael
The Dove (1974) - Kenniston
The Island at the Top of the World (1974) - The Butler
To Be or Not to Be (1983) - General Hobbs
Weird Science (1985) - Henry Donnelly
Action Jackson (1988) - Stuffy Old Guy

Selected TV series
CBC Summer Theatre (1955) - (1 episode) - the bishop
On Camera (1957) - (1 episode) - Duke
A Midsummer Theatre (1958) - (1 episode) - role unknown
First Performance (1955 - 1959) - (2 episodes) - role unknown
The Unforeseen (1958 - 1960) - (6 episode) - Roles Unknown
General Motors Theatre (1956 - 1960 ) - (20 episodes) - different character in each episode
Hudson's Bay (1959) - (3 episode) - Roger Phipps/The Director/The Governor
R.C.M.P. (1960) - (1 episode) - Lee Fletcher
First Person (1960 - 1961 ) - (2 episode) - unknown role/Prince of Milan
Festival ( 1960 - 1967) - (12 episodes) - various characters
Quest (1962 - 1963) - (4 episode) - unknown role/Professor Bjoernson/unknown role
The Forest Rangers  (1963) - (1 episode) - Professor Black
Scarlett Hill (1963) - (2 episode) - Elston/Walter Pendleton
Playdate (1962 - 1964) - (6 episode) - various roles
Moment of Truth (1964) - (unknown episode) - Dr. Russell Wingate
Seaway (1966) -  (2 episodes) – Huberman
Laredo (1966) - (1 episode) - Count Frollo
The Girl from U.N.C.L.E. (1966) - (1 episode) - Freuchen-Nagy 
Run for Your Life (1966) - (1 episode) - Dr. McEwen 
12 O’Clock High (1966) – (1 episode) – Air Marshal Kingsford
Daniel Boone (1966 - 1969) - (4 episodes) - President Washington/British Commandant/Commodore Morrison/Hamilton 
Bonanza (1966-1972) - (2 episodes) - Morgan / Preacher
The Flying Nun (1967) - (1 episode) - Bishop Dillion
Love on a Rooftop (1967) - (1 episode) - Dean Claridge 
Bewitched (1971) - (2 episodes) - Chamberlain 
The Partridge Family (1972) – (1 episode) – Mr. Hensley
The Streets of San Francisco (1974 - 1977) – (2 episodes) - Raymond Howard/Judge Dudley Cramer
Hawaii Five-O (1974) - (1 episode) - S.N. Savage/Dempster
The Rockford Files (1976) - Cryder
Barnaby Jones (1978) - (1 episode) - Dr. Kirby
Father Murphy (1982) - (1 episode) - Butler
The A-Team (1983) - (1 episode) - old man in cab
Matt Houston (1985) - (1 episode) - Lloyd Hutchins
Hotel (1985 - 1986) - (2 episodes) - Byron Singer/Alan Mahoney
Highway to Heaven (1984 - 1987) - (3 episodes) - Dr. Erhardt / Parks - Butler / Joseph
Jake and the Fatman (1988) - (1 episode) - Edward

References

External links

1919 births
2006 deaths
People from Merthyr Tydfil
Welsh male film actors
Welsh male stage actors
Welsh male television actors
British Army personnel of World War II
Royal Artillery personnel
Burials at Forest Lawn Memorial Park (Hollywood Hills)
Welsh military personnel